The Cape York mulch-skink (Glaphyromorphus crassicauda)  is a species of skink found in Queensland in Australia.

References

Glaphyromorphus
Reptiles described in 1851
Taxa named by André Marie Constant Duméril
Taxa named by Auguste Duméril
Taxobox binomials not recognized by IUCN